A soft-in soft-out (SISO) decoder is a type of soft-decision decoder used with error correcting codes.  "Soft-in" refers to the fact that the incoming data may take on values other than 0 or 1, in order to indicate reliability.  "Soft-out" refers to the fact that each bit in the decoded output also takes on a value indicating reliability.  Typically, the soft output is used as the soft input to an outer decoder in a system using concatenated codes, or to modify the input to a further decoding iteration such as in the decoding of turbo codes.

Examples include the BCJR algorithm and the soft output Viterbi algorithm.

See also 
 Decoding methods
 Error detection and correction
 Forward error correction

References

Error detection and correction